Sheikh Rashid bin Matar Al Qasimi was Ruler of Ras Al Khaimah and Sharjah from 1747–1777, as head of the Al Qasimi maritime federation. Rashid bin Matar ruled at a time when maritime violence was prevalent throughout the Persian Gulf, following incursions by the Portuguese and fighting at sea and on land on the Persian Coast between the British and Dutch and the British and French, over 'factories' established on that coast by both maritime powers.

Clashes with the British 
British East India Company interests were habitually protected by the use of firepower and two Arab maritime forces jostling for supremacy on both coasts of the Persian Gulf, the Al Qasimi and the Bani Ma'ain, soon found themselves in conflict with the British ( J. G. Lorimer reports 'the insolence of the local chiefs'). The Al Qasimi fleet of the time comprised some 63 large and 669 small ships and a force of 18,000 men.

In 1727, the Al Qasimi established a port at Qishm, causing a loss of trade to the British, which led to the bombardment of the Al Qasimi facility and a demand for restitution from the British for the losses they had suffered.

Alliances 
Following the invasion of Oman by the Persians under Nader Shah, the Shah of Iran, the Al Qasimi became increasingly distrustful of their new neighbours and one of Rashid bin Matar's first acts on acceding in 1747 was to conclude an alliance with Mulla Ali Shah, the former naval chief under Nader Shah who had taken the opportunity of the latter's assassination to seize Bandar Abbas. In 1755, Rashid together with Mulla Ali Shah attacked and took Qishm and Luft. This began a prolonged conflict with the Ma'in, who allied with Mir Mahanna, the Persian governor of Bandar Rig.

The overthrow of the Persians by the first of the Saidis of Muscat, the Imam Ahmad, created a new enemy for the Al Qasimis and they went to war with Muscat in 1758.

In 1759, Rashid allied with the Sheikh of Charak against Mir Mahanna.

The alliance with Mulla Ali Shah paid Rashid dividends when the long and bitter conflict with the Bani Ma'in was concluded with a peace agreement in January 1763 which ceded him a third of the revenues of Qishm island. Alliances shifted quickly, however, and by 1773 Rashid threw in his lot with the Sultan of Muscat in attacking Karim Khan, the Vakil of Persia, on the Persian coast. Two years later, the Al Qasimi were once again at war with Muscat.

Accusations of piracy 
It was under Rashid's reign that the first accusations of piracy were leveled against the Al Qasimi by the British, an incident in 1777 where Al Qasimi forces attacked and boarded an East India Company vessel. In responding to the British complaint, Rashid pointed out that the ship was running the colours of the Sultan of Muscat, with whom he was at war and therefore the taking of the ship was an acceptable act of war.

In 1777, Rashid resigned in favour of his son, Saqr bin Rashid.

References 

Sheikhs of the Emirate of Ras Al Khaimah
Rashid bin Matar
18th-century monarchs in the Middle East
History of the United Arab Emirates
18th-century Arabs